Buried in Your Black Heart is the first full-length album by Burden Brothers, after the release of multiple EPs.  This was Burden Brothers' first recording with a solidified band lineup.  The album was considered Burden Brothers' most successful album, spawning two relatively hit singles.   The album was released in November 2003  on Kirtland Records.  As of January 2007, the album has sold over 100,000 copies.

The album was a critical and commercial success, with "Beautiful Night" having an unofficial demo circulating throughout Texas area radio stations even before the album's recording.  When the album was released, sources such as the Dallas Observer stated the album was "early Soundgarden. Think '70s arena rock."  MTV said the album was a mixture of "Tough, driving metal & head-bobbing arena rock."

The lead single "Beautiful Night" was a commercial success, with it charting at #24 on the Billboard Mainstream Rock Charts, and being used for a variety of commercial purposes (the NHL team Dallas Stars used the song in their opening sequence because of the song's chorus and the line "It's a beautiful night/To watch the stars."  The follow-up single "Shadow" charted, but not nearly as high as "Beautiful Night".

Due to the relative success of the album, the band began touring as opening acts for Velvet Revolver, Papa Roach, and Finger Eleven.  This touring eventually led to the recording of a live DVD entitled RYFOLAMF.  During this time, the band also recruited Casey Hess for remaining tour dates and future recordings.  This album is one of Kirtland Records highest-selling albums to date.

Track listing
All songs by Taz Bentley and Vaden Todd Lewis unless otherwise noted.
 "Buried in Your Black Heart" – 2:14
 "Shadow" (Lewis) – 3:38
 "Beautiful Night" – 4:16
 "Come on Down" – 2:45
 "You're So God Damn Beautiful" – 4:40
 "If You're Going to Heaven" (Lewis) – 3:41
 "Do for Me" – 3:12
 "Walk Away" (Bentley) – 3:04
 "Your Fault" – 3:58
 "Conditional" (Lewis) – 4:57
 "Let It Go" – 4:52

Personnel
 Vaden Todd Lewis - vocals and guitar
 Corey Rozzoni - backing vocals and guitar
 Casey Orr - backing vocals and bass guitar
 Taz Bentley - backing vocals, drums, percussion, and guitar
 The Charismatics - gang vocal assistance (on "Do For Me")
 Beth Lewis - choir (on "Let it Go")
 Darla Oates - choir (on "Let it Go")
 Kelly Brown - choir (on "Let it Go")
 Suzette Carter Albrecht - keys (on "Your Fault" and "Let it Go")
 David Castell - producer
 Derek Taylor - mixing (except "Beautiful Night")
 David J. Holman - mixing ("Beautiful Night")
 John Kirtland - executive producer
 Robert Vosgien - mastering
 Angela Bures - album coordinator
 Razdezignz - album artwork
 Matt Cooper - band photos

Chart positions

Single

References

2003 albums
Burden Brothers albums
Kirtland Records albums
Albums produced by David Castell